Maree Edwards (born 8 February 1975) is a former female rugby union player. She represented . She was in the squad that won the 1998 Women's Rugby World Cup.

Edwards played provincial rugby for Canterbury and Otago.

References

1975 births
Living people
New Zealand women's international rugby union players
New Zealand female rugby union players
Place of birth missing (living people)